Jean-Daniel Gross (born 26 April 1966) is a Swiss football manager and former player. In his playing career, which ended in 2003, he played for clubs including Young Boys and Zug 94.

References

Football Lineups profile

1966 births
Living people
Swiss men's footballers
FC Fribourg players
BSC Young Boys players
FC Bulle players
SC Kriens players
Swiss Super League players
Association football defenders
Swiss football managers
FC Luzern managers
SC Kriens managers
People from Fribourg
Sportspeople from the canton of Fribourg